Lorna Jean McConchie (22 July 1914 – 9 December 2001) was a former Australia netball international and national team head coach. In 1938 McConchie played for Australia in their first international match against New Zealand. McConchie was later head coach when Australia won the inaugural 1963 World Netball Championships. In 2009 she was inducted into the Australian Netball Hall of Fame.

Early life and education
McConchie attended East Kew Primary School and University High School before studying physical education at the University of Melbourne. She subsequently became a lecturer at Melbourne and helped establish the university's physical education course. In 1949, she represented the Australian Physical Education Association at the first women's conference in Denmark.

Playing career

Clubs
McConchie played netball for East Kew, winning premierships in 1928, 1929 and 1930. She also played for University High School Old Pupils and Melbourne University.

Victoria
Between 1931 and 1940, McConchie played for Victoria in the Australian National Netball Championships. In 2000, together with Sharelle McMahon, Wilma Shakespear, Myrtle Baylis, Shelley O'Donnell and Simone McKinnis, McConchie was named in Netball Victoria's Team of the Century.

Australia
On 20 August 1938, McConchie played for Australia in a 40–11 win against New Zealand at Royal Park, Melbourne. This was the first netball Test between Australia and New Zealand. She was then named vice-captain of the Australia team that was due to tour New Zealand in 1940. However the tour was cancelled due to the outbreak of World War II.

Coaching career

University of Melbourne
Between 1959 and 1979, McConchie coached several Melbourne University club teams .

Australia
In 1956, McConchie was head coach when Australia  toured England, Scotland and Ceylon. The team was captained by Pat McCarthy. She was also head coach when Australia won the inaugural 1963 World Netball Championships. The team featured Joyce Brown and Wilma Shakespear.

Umpire and administrator
McConchie also served as a netball umpire and sports administrator. She served three terms as President of Netball Victoria in 1955–58, 1969–70, and 1980–81. In 1959, she was one of two Australian delegates at the inaugural conference of the International Netball Federation. This conference helped formulate the modern rules of netball. She subsequently became a member of the INF's rules interpretation committee  and attended every World Netball Championship between 1967 and 1983 in this capacity.

Honours

Head coach
Australia
World Netball Championships
Winners: 1963

Individual Awards

References

1914 births
2001 deaths
Australian netball players
Australia international netball players
Netball players from Melbourne
Australian netball coaches
Australia national netball team coaches
Australian netball administrators
Australian netball umpires
Australian women referees and umpires
Recipients of the Australian Sports Medal
University of Melbourne alumni
Academic staff of the University of Melbourne
University of Melbourne women